Moses Nsereko (died 15 September 1991) was a Ugandan football player, manager, and executive. During his playing career as a midfielder, he played for the Uganda national team at the 1976 and 1978 African Cup of Nations.

Club and managerial career 
Nsereko joined Kampala City Council (KCC) as a ball boy in the late 1960s, but regularly featured for the club's second team. It wasn't until 1970 that he was able to wear the "famous" yellow jersey of KCC. By 1971, he was a starter in KCC's team. Initially deployed as right winger by coach Jaberi Bidandi Ssali, Nsereko shifted in his favoured central midfield role with time. As a player at KCC, he helped the club win the Uganda National League in 1976 and 1977, and the CECAFA Club Cup in 1978.

In 1979, Nsereko was named player-coach at KCC following the departure of Bidandi Ssali. As a player-coach and head coach at KCC, Nsereko won the Uganda Super League in 1981, 1983, and 1985, and the Uganda Cup in 1979, 1980, 1982, and 1984. After a disappointing 1986 season, he resigned in 1987.

International career 
Nsereko was a youth international before playing for the Uganda national team. He made eight appearances and scored one goal for Uganda at the 1976 and 1978 African Cup of Nations, and was selected in the latter tournament's Team of the Tournament. Nsereko won the CECAFA Cup in 1973, 1976, and 1977; he missed the final penalty in a shoot-out defeat to Tanzania in the 1974 competition.

Executive career 
In April 1989, Nsereko was voted General Secretary of the Federation of Uganda Football Associations (FUFA). Under the leadership of President John Semanobe, he worked to create football structures. Thanks to the revamp of youth football development, the Uganda national team won back-to-back CECAFA Cup titles in 1989 and 1990. Nsereko held his position at FUFA until his death in 1991.

Death 
On 15 September 1991, Nsereko was brutally murdered outside his home at Wampewo flats in Kololo, Kampala. The unknown gunmen were never brought to justice. Nsereko left behind two widows and over seven children.

Nsereko's death sent shock waves throughout Ugandan football and particularly KCC supporters.

Honours 
Kampala City Council

 Uganda Super League: 1976, 1977, 1981, 1983, 1985
 Uganda Cup: 1979, 1980, 1982, 1984; runner-up: 1983, 1985
 CECAFA Club Cup: 1978
Uganda

 CECAFA Cup: 1973, 1976, 1977; runner-up: 1974

Individual

 African Cup of Nations Team of the Tournament: 1978

References 

Year of birth uncertain
1991 deaths
Ugandan footballers
Association football midfielders
Kampala Capital City Authority FC players
Uganda youth international footballers
Uganda international footballers
1976 African Cup of Nations players
1978 African Cup of Nations players
Ugandan football managers
Kampala Capital City Authority FC managers
Unsolved murders in Africa
Sportspeople from Kampala